The Laird LC-B was a three seat, single-engined biplane, built for private owners in the U.S. in the late 1920s and offering a variety of engines. About 35 had been built before production ceased in the mid-1930s. Two have been restored to flight.

Design and development

Many Laird aircraft were designated as LC (Laird Commercial). This was followed by an airframe code, B in this case, and an engine code. In the case of the LC-B the latter was the engine power; later types had a single letter code such as W for Wasp. 

All LC-B variants were unequal span single bay biplanes which seated three in two open cockpits. Though some sources suggest the wing dimensions varied between models, detailed contemporary reports of current models in 1927 and 1931 show no difference in spans, and lengths that depend only slightly on engine type.

The LB-Bs had wings of rectangular plan out to rounded tips, built around twin spruce box spars, plywood and spruce ribs and  fabric-covered. They were single bay biplanes, their wings braced together with only slight stagger by a pair of parallel interplane struts on each side. Outward-leaning, N-form cabane struts joined the fuselage to the upper wing centre section. Ailerons were fitted to both upper and lower wings and externally interconnected. There were long, near-rectangular cut-outs in the upper wings to improve the field of view from the pilot's cockpit.

The principal difference between the LC-B subtypes was the engine fitted. The earliest models were mostly fitted with  Wright J-4/5 Whirlwinds, though Curtiss radial engines could also be used. By 1930, most had either the Wright J-5  or the Wright J-6. Behind the engine the fuselage had a dural tube structure and was fabric-covered. The two passengers sat side-by-side under the upper wing in an easily accessed open cockpit. Tail surfaces were also fabric-covered and, with the exception of the wooden-framed tailplane, had steel structures. All the rear surfaces were full and rounded, apart from the tailplane's straight leading edge. The rudder was balanced.

The LC-Bs had fixed, split axle, conventional landing gear. The main legs, with rubber cord shock absorbers, and drag struts were mounted on the lower fuselage longerons. Wheel brakes were fitted on 1930s variants at least. The axles joined on a short frame just below the fuselage underside. A long tailskid extended from the extreme fuselage.

Operational history

The year of the first flight of the LC-B is variously given as 1924 or 1925. 11 of the 1925 LC-B series were built, one setting a record for the number of inside loops flown continuously (1,073). The pilot was Charles "Speed" Holman. 

Two LC-Rs with  J-5 Whirlwind engines were built in 1928. They were single seat racers, one competing in the 1930 Nationals.

Less than ten further aircraft were built in the 1930-1 batch and a further 11 of the wider LC-1Bs in 1935 ended LC-B production at a total of less than 34. Others have it as 36. Most of these were registered in the U.S. but four LB-200s went to Canada. 

After World War II one LC-1B300, N10402, was operated as a crop sprayer. Carefully restored, it still flies, owned by the Western Antique Aeroplane & Automobile Museum. In 2011 an airworthy LC-B200, NC6906, was in the Howie Collection in Decatur, Illinois. CF-APY, a B200, was flying until at least 2008 but has been on display since 2014 or earlier at the Reynolds Alberta Museum.

Variants
Data from Aerofiles:Laird

LC-B1925.  Wright Whirlwind or lower power Curtiss engines. Dimensions as LC-B. 11 built.
LC-R1928.  Wright J-5 Whirlwind engine. 2 built.
LC-1B2851930. Wright J-6 Whirlwind engine.
LC-1B2851930. Wright J-6 Whirlwind engine.
LC-B3001930.  Wright J-6 Whirlwind engine.
LC-1B3001930. De-luxe B300, with NACA cowling. 
LC-B2001931.  Wright J-5 Whirlwind engine. 
LC-1B2001931. De-luxe B200, with NACA cowling.
LC-1B1935. Wider fuselage than other LC-Bs. 11 built.

Specifications (LC-B300)

References

Biplanes
Single-engined tractor aircraft
1930s United States civil utility aircraft
Laird aircraft